Michael Settonni (August 13, 1959 - May 10, 2021). Born in Middleburg Heights, Ohio) & was a former on-air television news anchor and reporter who most recently worked for WEWS-TV in Cleveland, Ohio. Settonni, who is a 1977 graduate of Midpark High School in Middleburg Heights, Ohio, graduated from Ohio State University in 1981 with a degree in journalism. He has worked for NBC, CNN, The Walt Disney Company and network affiliated television stations in Boston, San Diego, Cleveland, OH, and Portland. Michael died unexpectedly on May 10, 2021.

Career
Settonni was President and CEO of Broadcast Media Ideas, a Cleveland-based full-service creative agency that works with companies and organizations - both large and small - to maximize jointly developed ideas using broadcast, CD-ROM, DVD, Internet web-streaming and non-traditional communication channels. "Come Join Our Success", an interactive video CD-ROM produced for the City of Cleveland, was awarded the prestigious AEGIS award for national excellence.

Settonni served as Communications Director for the Mayoral campaign of former Cleveland mayor Jane Campbell, and as Chief Campaign Strategist for the successful Mark Elliott for Mayor of Brook Park campaign, as well as dozens of other local area Mayor, Judicial and School Levy Campaigns.

Personal life
In 2009, Settonni was a candidate for Middleburg Heights, Ohio City Council, but withdrew after a domestic dispute with his wife, Nancy.

Awards
Settonni has earned 8 Emmy awards, 4 Golden Microphone awards and more than a dozen Press Club awards for his television work locally, nationally and internationally. He was also honored by the Center of Mental Retardation with the Media Award for his contributions to creating awareness about the needs of those with disabilities. United Cerebral Palsy of Greater Cleveland also named Mr. Settonni volunteer of the year in 2001.

 San Diego Emmy Awards, Outstanding Achievement News Feature, 1991
 San Diego Emmy Awards, Outstanding Achievement Journalistic Enterprise, 1990
 San Diego Emmy Awards, Outstanding Achievement, 1992
 San Diego Emmy Awards, Outstanding Achievement, 1990
 San Diego Press Club, Best Investigative Reporting, 1991
 San Diego Press Club, Best Regular Special Segment Edition, 1992
 San Diego Press Club, Best Show of Television, 1993
 San Diego Press Club, Best General Reporting, 1993
 San Diego Press Club, Best News Story, 1993
 Cleveland Emmy Awards, Outstanding Achievement, 1995
 Boston-New England Emmy Awards, Outstanding Breaking News, 1994
 California Golden Microphone, Best Investigative Reporting, 1992
 California Golden Microphone, Best News Special, 1992
 California Golden Microphone, Best Spot News Reporting, 1992
 California Golden Microphone, Best Regular Scheduled Specialized Segment, 1990

References

Living people
1959 births
Television anchors from Cleveland
American male journalists
People from Middleburg Heights, Ohio